Adrián José Hernández Acosta (born 2 May 1983), known as Pollo, is a Spanish former professional footballer who played as a midfielder.

Club career
Born in Mogán, Las Palmas, Pollo played youth football with UD Las Palmas. His professional debut was made at neighbours UD Vecindario, with whom he spent two years in the Segunda División B.

In 2005, Pollo signed for Atlético Madrid, spending two seasons with the reserves also in the third tier. On 6 January 2007 he played his first and only game in La Liga, coming on as a substitute for Luciano Galletti in the last minute of the home fixture against Gimnàstic de Tarragona (0–0).

Pollo returned to his native Canary Islands in summer 2007, joining Universidad de Las Palmas CF in division three. After two solid campaigns, he returned to former youth club Las Palmas, now in the Segunda División. He scored his only goal as a professional on 12 May 2011, closing the 2–0 home win over FC Cartagena.

References

External links

1983 births
Living people
People from Mogán
Sportspeople from the Province of Las Palmas
Spanish footballers
Footballers from the Canary Islands
Association football midfielders
La Liga players
Segunda División players
Segunda División B players
Tercera División players
UD Las Palmas Atlético players
UD Vecindario players
Atlético Madrid B players
Atlético Madrid footballers
Universidad de Las Palmas CF footballers
UD Las Palmas players
UD San Sebastián de los Reyes players